Mohamed Fidadi (born 2 March 1968) is a retired Moroccan footballer. As of 2014, he coaches the under-12 team of Al Shamal in Qatar.

International career
Fidadi made his international debut on January 17, 1993 against the 0–1 away win over Ethiopia in the 1994 FIFA World Cup qualification (CAF – First Round).

References

External links 
 
 
 

1968 births
Living people
Moroccan footballers
Morocco international footballers
Moroccan expatriate footballers
Moroccan expatriate sportspeople in Malaysia
Moroccan expatriate sportspeople in Saudi Arabia
Expatriate footballers in Saudi Arabia
Ettifaq FC players
Expatriate footballers in Malaysia
Selangor FA players
Expatriate footballers in the Maldives
Victory Sports Club players
Olympique Club de Khouribga players
Association football forwards